The 1949 Albanian National Championship was the twelfth season of the Albanian National Championship, the top professional league for association football clubs, since its establishment in 1930.

Overview
It was contested by 9 teams, and Partizani won the championship.

League standings

 Vlora were withdraw from the league after two rounds.

Note: 'Shkodra' is Vllaznia, 'Ylli i Kuq Durrësi' is KS Teuta Durrës, 'Tirana' is SK Tirana, 'Kavaja' is Besa, 'Korça' is Skënderbeu, 'Fieri' is Apolonia and 'Shijaku' is Erzeni

Results

References

Kategoria Superiore seasons
1
Albania
Albania